Mary Josephine Nash Baldwin (born 1947) is an Irish historian living in Catalonia. She has specialized in the study of the history of women and feminism in Spain.

Biography
In 1967, she graduated from the National University of Ireland, and in 1975 she obtained a licentiate in philosophy and letters at the University of Barcelona. She received her doctorate there in 1977 in the specialty of modern history, with the thesis La mujer en las organizaciones políticas de izquierdas en España, 1931-1939. In 1982, she was one of the founders of the Women's Historical Research Center at the University of Barcelona.

In 1984, she won the Emilia Pardo Bazán prize for her work Presencia y protagonismo. Aspectos de la historia de las mujeres. In 1995, the Generalitat de Catalunya awarded her the Creu de Sant Jordi. In 2008 she received the President Macià Working Medal. In 2010 she became a Doctor Honoris Causa at the University of Granada.

She is a Professor of Contemporary History at the University of Barcelona.

Books
 Mujer y movimiento obrero en España. Barcelona: Fontamara, 1981.
 Experiencias desiguales: conflictos sociales y respuestas colectivas: siglo XIX. Susanna Tavera, Mary Nash. Madrid: Síntesis, 1994.
 Defying Male Civilization: Women in the Spanish Civil War. Denver: Arden Press, 1995.
 Rojas: las mujeres republicanas en la Guerra Civil española. Madrid: Taurus, 1999 (Spanish version of Defying Male Civilization: Women in the Spanish Civil War (1995); translated by Irene Cifuentes, as the basis of her doctoral thesis.
 Mujeres en el Mundo. Historia, retos y movimientos. Madrid: Alianza, 2004.
 Inmigrantes en nuestro espejo: inmigración y discurso periodístico en la prensa española. Barcelona: Icaria/Antrzyt, 2005.
 Dones en transició: de la resistència política a la legitimitat feminista: les dones en la Barcelona de la Transició. Barcelona: Ajuntament de Barcelona, 2007.
 Trabajadoras: un siglo de trabajo femenino en Cataluña [1900-2000]. Barcelona: Generalitat de Catalunya, 2010.

References

External links

 List of works at the University of Barcelona

1947 births
20th-century Spanish historians
21st-century Spanish historians
20th-century Irish historians
Alumni of the National University of Ireland
Historians from Catalonia
Feminist historians
Irish feminists
Irish women non-fiction writers
Living people
Spanish feminists
University of Barcelona alumni
Academic staff of the University of Barcelona
Women historians
20th-century Irish women writers